Ivar (Old Norse Ívarr) is a  Scandinavian masculine given name. Another variant of the name is Iver, which is more common in Norway.
The Old Norse name has several possible etymologies. In North Germanic phonology, several of the elements common to Germanic names became homophonous. The first element Ívarr may contain  yr "yew" and -arr (from hari, "warrior"), 
but it may have become partly conflated with Ingvar, and possibly Joar (element jó "horse"). The second element -arr may alternatively also be from geir "spear" or it may be  var "protector".
The name was adopted into English as Ivor, into Gaelic as Ìomhar, and into Latvian as Ivars.

People called Ivar

Pre-Modern
Ivar the Boneless, Viking king, who some scholars believe to be identical to:
Ímar
 Uí Ímair (House of Ivar), his descendants
 Ragnall ua Ímair
 Sihtric ua Ímair
 Gofraid ua Ímair
Ivar Vidfamne, legendary Danish king of at least Scania and Zealand
Ivar of Waterford, Norse king of Waterford and briefly King of Dublin
Ivar of Limerick, last Norse king of Limerick
 Ímar Ua Ruaidín, medieval Irish bishop
Ímar Ua Donnabáin (Ivor O'Donovan), legendary Irish navigator and sorcerer
Ímar mac Arailt, King of Dublin

Modern

Ivar, ring name of American professional wrestler Todd Smith
Ivar Aasen, Norwegian lexicographer, creator of Nynorsk
Ivar Aavatsmark, Norwegian officer and politician 
Ivar Afzelius, Swedish jurist and politician
Ivar Aminoff, Finnish lawyer and politician 
Ivar Antonsen, Norwegian jazz pianist and composer
Ivar Aronsson, Swedish rower
Ivar Asjes, Curaçaoan politician 
Ivar Frithiof Andresen, Norwegian opera singer
Ivar Arosenius, Swedish painter
Ivar Backlund, Swedish officer
Ivar Bae, Norwegian politician 
Ivar Ballangrud, Norwegian speed skater
Ivar Belck-Olsen, Norwegian politician 
Ivar Bern, Norwegian chess player
Ivar Bjørnson, Norwegian composer/guitarist (Enslaved) 
Ivar Böhling, Finnish wrestler
Ivar Otto Bendixson, Swedish mathematician
Ivar Bentsen, Danish architect
Ivar Bergersen Sælen, Norwegian politician
Ivar Bern, Norwegian chess player
Ivar Bredal, Danish composer 
Ivar Brogger, American actor
Ivar Campbell, New Zealand screenwriter and film director
Ivar Colquhoun, British noble
Ivar van Dinteren, Dutch footballer 
Ivar Ekeland, French mathematician
Ivar Enger, Norwegian former-guitarist of Darkthrone
Ivar Eriksson, Swedish footballer 
Ivar Formo, Norwegian cross-country skier
Ivar Andreas Forn, Norwegian footballer
Ivar Geelmuyden, Norwegian politician
Ivar Genesjö, Swedish fencer
Ivar de Graaf, Dutch drummer (Kingfisher Sky)
Ivar Grünthal, Estonian poet and politician
Ivar Grydeland, Norwegian jazz musician
Ivar Hallström, Swedish composer
Ivar Hippe, Norwegian consultant and former journalist
Ivar Ivask, Estonian poet and literary scholar
Ivar Johansen, Norwegian bobsledder
Ivar Johansen, Norwegian journalist
Ravi (Ivar Johansen), Norwegian singer
Ivar Johansson, Swedish wrestler
Ivar Johansson, Swedish politician
Ivar Asbjørn Følling, Norwegian physician
Ivar Gewert, Swedish Army officer
Ivar Giaever, Norwegian physicist
Ivars Godmanis, prime minister of Latvia 1990-1993, 2007–2009
Ivar Haglund, Seattle folk singer and founder of Ivar's
Ivar Hippe, Norwegian consultant and former journalist
Ivar Holmquist, Swedish Army officer and sports official
Ívar Ingimarsson, Icelandic footballer
Ivar Jacobson, Swedish computer scientist
Ivar Kallion, Estonian Communist politician
Ivar Kants, Australian actor
Ivar Larsen Kirkeby-Garstad, Norwegian politician
Ivar Kleiven, Norwegian historian and poet
Ivar Kreuger, Swedish businessman
Ivar Langen, Norwegian rector
Ivar Lassy, Finnish writer, anthropologist and communist
Ivar Lo-Johansson, Swedish writer
Ivar Lykke (politician), Norwegian politician and prime minister from 1926 to 1928
Ivar Medaas, Norwegian folksinger and fiddle player 
Lord Ivar Mountbatten, English lord 
Ivar Nordkild, Norwegian biathlete
Ivar Rooth, Swedish banker
Ivar Sisniega, Mexican pentathlete
Ivar Skippervold, Norwegian singer and musician
Ivar Skulstad, Norwegian politician
Ivar Stakgold Norwegian-born American academic (mathematician) 
Ivar Tengbom, Swedish architect
Ivar Peterson Tveiten, Norwegian politician
Ivar Smilga, Bolshevik revolutionary leader
Ivar Tallo (born 1964), Estonian political scientist and politician
Ivar Karl Ugi, Estonian chemist
Ivar Michal Ulekleiv, Norwegian biathlete
Ivar Vennerström, Swedish politician
Ivar Vičs, Dutch graffiti artist 
Ivar Anton Waagaard, Norwegian musician (pianist) 
Ivar Wickman, Swedish physician
Ivar Öhman, Swedish journalist and diplomat

Fictional characters
Ivar the Timewalker, Valiant Comics universe
 Ivar Barfoth, character in the Swedish writer Hjalmar Bergman's novel Markurells of Wadköping ( 1919 ) and Me, Ljung and Medardus ( 1923 )

Businesses called Ivar
IVAR, an American lifestyle brand of urban commuting and travel backpacks based on a patented design. Based in San Francisco, CA, and founded in 2006 by consumer product entrepreneur and designer Ian Ivarson. 
Ivar London,  British lifestyle company for the home founded in 2013 by Patrick Dougherty in London whose website is at ivarlondon.com. Sought after for design and products for the home
 Ivar's, a restaurant in Seattle opened in 1938 by Ivar Haglund

Products called Ivar

 IVAR System, an IKEA range of shelves.
 IVAR Edge AI, an intelligent video analytics recorder.

See also
Ivars, Latvian masculine given name derived from Ivar

References

Scandinavian masculine given names
Norwegian masculine given names
Swedish masculine given names
Estonian masculine given names